La Pieve is a village in Tuscany, central Italy, administratively a frazione of the comune of Calci, province of Pisa.

La Pieve is the municipal seat of the municipality of Calci. It is about 13 km from Pisa.

Main sights 
 Pieve dei Santi Giovanni ed Ermolao

References

Bibliography 
 

Frazioni of the Province of Pisa